Jerry Bryan Lincecum (born 1942) is a speaker and retired Emeritus Professor of English at Austin College in Sherman, Texas. He is a folklorist and specialist in Texas and Southwestern literature.

Education
Linceum holds a bachelor's degree from Texas A&M University. He earned a master's degree and PhD from Duke University.

Professional activities
Linceum became a member of the faculty at Austin College in 1967, and retired in 2006 as professor emeritus of English. He is the director and founder of the Telling Our Stories Project in Autobiography, which has attracted international attention to Austin College. This is a program that encourages senior citizens to write their autobiographies.

He has served as president of the Texas Folklore Society,

Awards
Linceum has been awarded the Silver Certificate of Merit by the Daughters of the Republic of Texas and the Miss Ima Hogg Historical Achievement Award for Outstanding Research on Texas History. His book on the pioneer naturalist Gideon Lincecum, Science on the Texas Frontier: Observations of Dr. Gideon Lincecum has been reviewed by several academic journals both in history and in the sciences, as have some of his other books.

Books
Linceum has written or edited eight books and numerous articles.
 Adventures of a Frontier Naturalist: The Life and Times of Dr. Gideon Lincecum (1994)    
 Telling Our Stories, Vol. 1: Grayson County Reminiscences (1996)
 Science on the Texas Frontier: Observations of Dr. Gideon Lincecum (1997)    
Review,  Journal of American History, Mar., 1999, vol. 85, no. 4, p. 1610-1611
Journal of Southern History, May, 1999, vol. 65, no. 2, p. 404-405
Review,  The Western Historical Quarterly, Autumn, 1998, vol. 29, no. 3, p. 412-413
Review,  Environmental History, Jan., 1996, vol. 1, no. 1, p. 116-118
Review,  Isis, Sep., 1998, vol. 89, no. 3, p. 557
Review,  Taxon, Nov., 1996, vol. 45, no. 4, p. 726
 Telling Our Stories, Vol. 2: Texas Family Secrets (1997)
 Telling Our Stories, Vol. 3: Texas Millennium Book  (1999)
 Gideon Lincecum's Sword: Civil War Letters from the Texas Homefront (2001)    
Review,  Journal of Southern History, Nov., 2002, vol. 68, no. 4, p. 975-976
 The Family Saga: A Collection of Texas Family Legends (2003)    
 Telling Our Stories, Vol. 4: More Texas Family Secrets  (2003)
 Telling Our Stories, Vol. 5: Remembering School Days (2005)
 editor, The Life and Times of Grayson County, Texas (2006)

References

External links
 Humanities Texas Speakers Directory
 ]http://bulletin.austincollege.edu/bulletin/faculty/ Austin College Faculty]
 The Family Saga: A Collection of Texas Family Legends

1942 births
20th-century American novelists
21st-century American novelists
American folklorists
American male novelists
Austin College faculty
Texas A&M University alumni
Living people
People from Sherman, Texas
20th-century American male writers
21st-century American male writers
Novelists from Texas